Samuel Trives Trejo (born November 8, 1972 in Madrid, Spain) is a former Spanish handball player. He played mostly for BM Alcobendas & BM Ciudad Real. His usual position is right winger. Currently he trains a Spanish handball team called Bacovi.Nowadays he trains handball on the Selection of Madrid of handball.

Clubs
Club Juventud Alcalá
CB Cantabria
BM Ciudad Real
BM Alcobendas

Trophies
ASOBAL League: 2
 1995 and 2004
EHF Champion's League: 2
 2002 and 2003
Copa del Rey: 2
 1995 and 2003
ASOBAL Cup: 1
 2004
Spanish Super Cup: 1
 2005
European Super Cup: 2
 2002 and 2003
2ª Nacional Cup
 2017 2018 5º Bacovi (Coach)

References

1972 births
Living people
Spanish male handball players
Liga ASOBAL players
BM Ciudad Real players